The Olathe News is a newspaper based in Olathe, Kansas, in the United States. It was the sponsor to Kavya Shivashankar, the winner of the 2009 Scripps National Spelling Bee.

See also
 List of newspapers in Kansas

External links

 The Olathe News official site
 The McClatchy Company's subsidiary profile of The Olathe News

Newspapers published in Kansas
McClatchy publications
Olathe, Kansas
1861 establishments in Kansas